The Algemene Spaar- en Lijfrentekas / Caisse générale d'épargne et de retraite (ASLK / CGER) was a major Belgian public bank, originally created in 1850 as a pension institution. It was acquired in stages between 1993 and 1998 by Fortis Group. In 1996 it took over Société Nationale de Crédit à l'Industrie (SNCI), another Belgian public bank. In 1999 Fortis merged it with Generale Bank and other operations to form Fortis Bank, which in turn was integrated from 2009 into BNP Paribas.

History

The institution was the brainchild of Belgian statesman Walthère Frère-Orban, who by law of  created Belgium's , and on  transformed it into the CGER by expanding it with a savings bank. Frère-Orban intended the CGER to provide savings and pension services to workers and the general public, taking inspiration from savings banks in neighboring countries and particularly German Sparkassen. The CGER was thus established as a sui generis public-sector entity guaranteed by the Belgian state.

In 1870, the CGER started distributing its services through the Belgian network of post offices, making it in practice the country's postal savings system, after having previously used the network of the National Bank. The number of savings accounts held at the CGER grew rapidly, reaching 730,000 in 1890 and 3.1 million in 1913. The CGER was gradually authorized by the Belgian government to diversify its activity into more banking services offerings. In 1884 the CGER started to provide agricultural loans. From 1889 it started providing mortgages to workers and related life insurance services. In the first half of the 20th century it was heavily involved in the financing of Belgium's housing and agricultural development policies. 

After World War II, it expanded further into export credit and lending to industry, and also lent significantly to the Belgian state itself. from 1959 it started building up its own branch network, and in 1975 was eventually granted a general banking license. In 1980 it was also authorized to expand abroad. In 1992 it became a joint-stock holding company, in French CGER-Holding, with two main subsidiaries for banking and insurance services respectively, in French CGER-Banque and CGER-Assurances. In 1993, Fortis Group acquired half of the equity of both the banking and insurance subsidiaries from the Belgian state, then further raised its stake to 74.9 percent in 1997 and 100 percent in 1998. Fortis merged ASLK/CGER with Generale Bank in mid-1999. Since 2009, the former CGER operations have subsequently been part of BNP Paribas Fortis.

Société Nationale de Crédit à l'Industrie

The Société Nationale de Crédit à l’Industrie (SNCI/NMKN,), branded  from the 1980s, was created in 1919 by the Belgian state in the context of post-World War I reconstruction. Like the ASLK / CGER, it was a non-profit state entity, which first specialised in shipping loans, and after World War II was involved in the distribution of loans under the Marshall Plan. From 1968 to 1986, it partnered with ASLK / CGER and became a major provider of state aid to Belgian industrial businesses, e.g. in the textile and steel sectors. After 1986 it started developing its own banking service offerings and was granted a full banking license in 1994, but was soon sold by the Belgian state to ASLK / CGER which fully absorbed it in 1997.

Brussels headquarters complex

In 1874, the CGER moved into a brand-new neo-Renaissance building designed by architect  at No. 31 of the newly created Place de Brouckère. In 1888, the CGER decided to build another head office on the nearby , which was designed by architect Hendrik Beyaert (with assistance from Paul Hankar for metalwork design) and completed in 1893. Meanwhile, the CGER sold its former building in 1891 to Prosper and Edouard Wielemans, who remodeled it with added floors into the famed Hotel Métropole, opened in 1894.

The  bordering the rue du Fossé aux Loups was later enlarged on several occasions: in 1901-1904 (architect Henri Van Dievoet), 1910-1918 (arch. ), 1930-1934 and 1947-1953 (arch. ), 1969-1975 (arch.  and associates), and 1980-1986 (arch. Alfred Chambon's second extension, designed in 1946-1947 and inaugurated in 1953 on the location of the former director's residence, displays an original monumental style with stone and copper-clad façades and a decorative frieze by sculptor , as well as state-of-the-art technical facilities inside. One of the 1980s extensions collapsed in 2013 during renovation.

In 2011, following the acquisition of the Belgian operations of Fortis Group by BNP Paribas, BNP Paribas Fortis sold the complex's southern block to property developed Allfin for mixed-use redevelopment including apartments, office space, and a school.

Leadership
 Henri de Brouckère, chairman 1865-1889
 Victor Van Hoegaerden, chairman 1889-1905
 Maurice Anspach, chairman 1919-1936
 Fernand Hautain, chairman 1937-1938
 , chairman 1938-1947
 Raoul Miry, chairman 1947-1952
 Émile van Dievoet, chairman 1952-1954
 Max Drechsel, chairman 1954-1969
 Louis Van Helshoecht, chairman ca. 1969-1980
 , chairman ca. 1980-1991
 , chairman 1992-1996
 Karel De Boeck, chairman 1996-1999

See also
 Generale Bank
 Groupe Caisse d'Épargne

Notes

Defunct banks of Belgium